Nikolajs Fārnasts (born 1 October 1885, date of death unknown) was a Latvian wrestler. He competed for Russia in the heavyweight event at the 1912 Summer Olympics.

References

External links
 

1885 births
Year of death missing
Latvian male sport wrestlers
Olympic wrestlers of Russia
Wrestlers at the 1912 Summer Olympics
Russian male sport wrestlers
Sportspeople from Riga